The imperative mood is a grammatical mood that forms a command or request.

The imperative mood is used to demand or require that an action be performed. It is usually found only in the present tense, second person. To form the imperative mood, use the base form of the verb. They are sometimes called directives, as they include a feature that encodes directive force, and another feature that encodes modality of unrealized interpretation.

An example of a verb used in the imperative mood is the English phrase "Go." Such imperatives imply a second-person subject (you), but some other languages also have first- and third-person imperatives, with the meaning of "let's (do something)" or "let them (do something)" (the forms may alternatively be called cohortative and jussive).

Imperative mood can be denoted by the glossing abbreviation . It is one of the irrealis moods.

Formation 
Imperative mood is often expressed using special conjugated verb forms. Like other finite verb forms, imperatives often inflect for person and number. Second-person imperatives (used for ordering or requesting performance directly from the person being addressed) are most common, but some languages also have imperative forms for the first and third persons (alternatively called cohortative and jussive respectively).

In English, the imperative is formed using the bare infinitive form of the verb (see English verbs for more details). This is usually also the same as the second-person present indicative form, except in the case of the verb to be, where the imperative is be while the indicative is are. (The present subjunctive always has the same form as the imperative, although it is negated differently – the imperative is negated using do not, as in "Don't touch me!"; see do-support. Occasionally do is not used: Dare not touch me!) The imperative form is understood as being in the second person (the subject pronoun you is usually omitted, although it can be included for emphasis), with no explicit indication of singular or plural. First and third person imperatives are expressed periphrastically, using a construction with the imperative of the verb let:
 Let me (Let's) see. (Internal monologue equivalent to a first person singular imperative)
 Let us (Let's) go. (equivalent to a first person plural imperative)
 Let us be heard. (Royal we in an equivalent to a first person passive imperative; also constructions like "We are to be heard")
 Let him/her/it/them run. (equivalent to a third person imperative; constructions with may are also used)
 Let him/her/it/them be counted. (Equivalent to a third person passive imperative)

Other languages

Other languages such as Latin, French and German have a greater variety of inflected imperative forms, marked for person and number, their formation often depending on a verb's conjugation pattern. Examples can be found in the specific language sections below.

The second person singular imperative often consists of just the stem of the verb, without any ending – this is the case in the Slavic languages, for example.

For example, Te Reo Māori has the imperative "me", which in addition to being put in front of sentences to command (e.g. "Me horoi ō ringaringa"; "(you must) wash your hands"), is used to assert the imperative mood in sentences that would be translated as "let's (let us)" in English. An example of this is "Me haere tāua", which translates to "let us (you and me) go", but the "us" component goes last.

Syntax and negation 
Imperative sentences sometimes use different syntax than declarative or other types of clauses. There may also be differences of syntax between affirmative and negative imperative sentences. In some cases the imperative form of the verb is itself different when negated. A distinct negative imperative form is sometimes said to be in prohibitive or vetative mood (abbreviated ).

Negative imperatives tell the subject to not do something. They usually begin with the verb "don't" or the negative form of a verb. e.g., example, "Don't be like that."

Many languages, even not normally null-subject languages, omit the subject pronoun in imperative sentences, as usually occurs in English (see below). Details of the syntax of imperative sentences in certain other languages, and of differences between affirmative and negative imperatives, can be found in some of the other specific language sections below.

Usage 
Imperatives are used principally for ordering, requesting or advising the listener to do (or not to do) something: "Put down the gun!", "Pass me the sauce", "Don't go too near the tiger." They are also often used for giving instructions as to how to perform a task: "Install the file, then restart your computer". They can sometimes be seen on signs giving orders or warnings "Stop", "Give way", "Do not enter".
  
The use of the imperative mood may be seen as impolite, inappropriate or even offensive in certain circumstances. In polite speech, orders or requests are often phrased instead as questions or statements, rather than as imperatives:
 Could you come here for a moment? (more polite than "Come here!")
 It would be great if you made us a drink. (for "Make us a drink!")
 I have to ask you to stop. (for "Stop!")

Politeness strategies (for instance, indirect speech acts) can seem more appropriate in order not to threaten a conversational partner in their needs of self-determination and territory: the partner's negative face should not appear threatened. As well as the replacement of imperatives with other sentence types as discussed above, there also often exist methods of phrasing an imperative in a more polite manner, such as the addition of a word like please; or a phrase like if you could; or substituting one directive for another, as in the change from will to may e.g, "you will do that" becomes "you may / can do that".

Imperatives are also used for speech acts whose function is not primarily to make an order or request, but to give an invitation, give permission, express a wish, make an apology, et cetera:   
 Come to the party tomorrow! (invitation)
 Eat the apple if you want. (permission)
 Have a nice trip! (wish)
 Pardon me. (apology)

When written, imperative sentences are often, but not always, terminated with an exclamation mark.

First person plural imperatives (cohortatives) are used mainly for suggesting an action to be performed together by the speaker and the addressee (and possibly other people): "Let's go to Barbados this year", "Let us pray". Third person imperatives (jussives) are used to suggest or order that a third party or parties be permitted or made to do something: "Let them eat cake", "Let him be executed".

There is an additional imperative form that is used for general prohibitions, consisting of the word "no" followed by the gerund form. The best known examples are "No Smoking" and "No Parking". This form does not have a positive form; that is, "Parking" by itself has no meaning unless used as a noun when it tells that parking is permitted.

The following sentences demonstrate several different forms of the imperative mood.

 In the second person without personal pronouns: "Go to your cubicle!"
 With reflexive pronouns: "Give yourself a break."
 With a direct object: "Hit the ball."
 Referring to third-person objects of the main verb: "Okay. The test is over now. They win. Let them go back to the recovery annex. For their cake."
 As an affirmative imperative (also called positive imperative form): "Go for it!"
 As a negative imperative (also called a negative command): "Don't do that!"
 Expressing wishes: "Let's go team-name!"
 In future tense: "You will behave yourself."

In particular languages
For more details on imperatives in the languages listed below, and in languages that are not listed, see the articles on the grammar of the specific languages.

English
English usually omits the subject pronoun in imperative sentences:

You work hard. (indicative)
Work hard! (imperative; subject pronoun you omitted)
However, it is possible to include the you in imperative sentences for emphasis. 
 
English imperatives are negated using don't (as in "Don't work!") This is a case of do-support as found in indicative clauses; however in the imperative it applies even in the case of the verb be (which does not use do-support in the indicative):
You are not late. (indicative)
Don't be late! (imperative)
It is also possible to use do-support in affirmative imperatives, for emphasis or (sometimes) politeness: "Do be quiet!", "Do help yourself!".

The subject you may be included for emphasis in negated imperatives as well, following don't: "Don't you dare do that again!"

Latin

Latin regular imperatives include amā (2nd pers. singular) and amāte (2nd pers. plural), from the infinitive amāre (to love); similarly monē and monēte from monēre (to advise/warn); audī and audīte from audīre (to hear), etc. The negative imperative is formed with the infinitive of the verb, preceded by the imperative of nōlle (to not want): nōlī stāre (don't stand, 2nd pers. singular) and nōlīte stāre (2nd pers. plural); compare the positive imperative stā (stand, 2nd pers. singular) and stāte (2nd pers. plural).

For third-person imperatives, the subjunctive mood is used instead.

In Latin there is a peculiar tense in the imperative, which is the future tense that is used when you want the mandate to be fulfilled in the future. This time is used mainly in laws, wills, precepts, etc. However, it is conjugated only with the third and second person singular and plural which carries as a gramme or ending -tō for the second and third person singular, -tōte for the second person plural and -ntō for the third person plural. On the other hand, in other languages of the world there is a distinctive imperative, which also has a future value, but with a previous meaning and this is the so-called past imperative that appears in the French and Greek languages as a point of reference. See Latin conjugation.

Sentence examples of the future imperative:

 Facito voluntas patris mei. (You will do my father's will.)
 Numquam iuranto in falso. (They will not swear falsely.)
 Ne occidito fratrem tuum. (You will not kill your brother.)
 Facito quae dico vobis. (You will do what I tell you.)
 Auditote quae dico vobis. (You will listen to what I say.)

Germanic languages

Dutch
A peculiar feature of Dutch is that it can form an imperative mood in the pluperfect tense. Its use is fairly common:
 Had gebeld! (You should have called!, If only you had called)
 Was gekomen! (You should have come!, If only you had come)

German
German verbs have a singular and a plural imperative. The singular imperative is equivalent to the bare stem or the bare stem + -e. (In most verbs, both ways are correct.) The plural imperative is the same as the second-person plural of the present tense.

 Sing! or: Singe! – said to one person: "Sing!"
 Singt! – said to a group of persons: "Sing!"

In order to emphasize their addressee, German imperatives can be followed by the nominative personal pronouns du ("thou; you [sg.]") or ihr ("you [pl.]"), respectively. For example: "Geh weg! "– "Geh du doch weg!" ("Go away!" – "Why, you go away!").

German has T/V distinction, which means that the pronouns du and ihr are used chiefly towards persons with whom one is privately acquainted, which holds true for the corresponding imperatives. (For details see German grammar.) Otherwise, the social-distance pronoun Sie (you) is used for both singular and plural. Since there exists no actual imperative corresponding to Sie, the form is paraphrased with the third-person plural of the present subjunctive followed by the pronoun:

 Singen Sie! – said to one or more persons: "Sing!"
 Seien Sie still! – said to one or more persons: "Be quiet!"

Occasionally, the infinitive (Infinitiv or Infinitiv als Imperativ) may be used as a mild or polite imperative, in order to avoid directly addressing the person or to simplify the sentence's construction. Although sometimes used in spoken language, this form is most commonly used in general instructions and recipes. Examples include:

 Nicht rauchen! – "No smoking!"
 Pasta im Salzwasser sehr bissfest kochen und abtropfen lassen. - "Cook the pasta al dente and drain."
 Bitte nicht berühren! - "Please do not touch!"

Like English, German features many constructions that express commands, wishes, etc. They are thus semantically related to imperatives without being imperatives grammatically:
 Lasst uns singen! (Let's sing!)
 Mögest du singen! (You may sing!)
 Du sollst singen! (You should sing!)

Romance languages

French
Examples of regular imperatives in French are mange (2nd pers. singular), mangez (2nd pers. plural) and mangeons (1st person plural, "let's eat"), from manger (to eat) – these are similar or identical to the corresponding present indicative forms, although there are some irregular imperatives that resemble the present subjunctives, such as sois, soyez and soyons, from être (to be). A third person imperative can be formed using a subjunctive clause with the conjunction que, as in qu'ils mangent de la brioche (let them eat cake).

French uses different word order for affirmative and negative imperative sentences:
 Donne-le-leur. (Give it to them.)
 Ne le leur donne pas. (Don't give it to them.)

The negative imperative (prohibitive) has the same word order as the indicative. See  for detail.
Like in English, imperative sentences often end with an exclamation mark, e.g. to emphasize an order.

In French there is a very distinctive imperative which is the imperative mood of preterite tense also called (past imperative or imperative of future perfect), expresses a given order with previous future value which must be executed or fulfilled in a future not immediate, as if it were an action to come, but earlier in relation to another that will also happen in the future. However, this type of imperative is peculiar to French which has only one purpose: to order that something be done before the date or time, therefore, this will always be accompanied by a circumstantial complement of time. However, this imperative is formed with the auxiliary verb of the avoir compound tenses and with the auxiliary verb être that is also used to form the tenses composed of the pronominal verbs and some of the intransitive verbs, this means that the structure of the verb imperative in its entirety is composed. Examples:

 Soyez levés demain avant huit heures. (Get up tomorrow before eight o'clock.) [With the auxiliary être]
 Ayez fini le travail avant qu'il (ne) fasse nuit. (Finish the work before it gets dark.) [With the auxiliary avoir and optional expletive ne]
 Aie écrit le livre demain. (Write the book tomorrow.) [With the auxiliary avoir]
 Soyez partis à midi. (Leave at noon.) [With the auxiliary être]
 Ayons fini les devoirs à 6 h. (Let us complete homework at 6 o'clock.) [With the auxiliary avoir]

In English there is no equivalent grammatical structure to form this tense of the imperative mood; it is translated in imperative mood of present with previous value.

Spanish
In Spanish, imperatives for the familiar singular second person (tú) are usually identical to indicative forms for the singular third person. However, there are irregular verbs for which unique imperative forms for tú exist. vos (alternative to tú) usually takes the same forms as tú (usually with slightly different emphasis) but unique forms exist for it as well. vosotros (plural familiar second person) also takes unique forms for the imperative.

If an imperative takes a pronoun as an object, it is appended to the verb; for example, Dime (Tell me). Pronouns can be stacked like they can in indicative clauses:

 Me lo dices. (You tell me it or You tell it to me, can also mean You tell me as lo usually isn't translated)
 Dímelo. (Tell me it, Tell it to me, Tell me)

Imperatives can be formed for usted (singular formal second person), ustedes (plural second person), and nosotros (plural first person) from the respective present subjunctive form. Negative imperatives for these pronouns (as well as tú, vos, and vosotros) are also formed this way, but are negated by no (e.g. No cantes, "Don't sing").

Portuguese
In Portuguese, affirmative imperatives for singular and plural second person (tu / vós) derive from their respective present indicative conjugations, after having their final -s dropped. On the other hand, their negative imperatives are formed by their respective subjunctive forms, as well as both affirmative and negative imperatives for treatment pronouns (você(s)) and plural first person (nós).

If a verb takes a pronoun, it should be appended to the verb:
 Diz(e)-me. (Tell me) Portugal/Brazil
 Me diz. (Tell me) Brazil (spoken)
 Diz(e)-mo. (Tell me it, Tell it to me)

Indic Languages

Hindi-Urdu
In Hindi-Urdu (Hindustani) the imperatives are conjugated by adding suffixes to the root verb. The negative and positive imperatives are not constructed differently in Hindustani. There are three negations that be used to form negative imperatives. They are:

 Imperative negation - mat  मत مت (used with verbs in imperative mood)
 Indicative negation - nahī̃  नहीं نہیں (used with verbs in indicative and presumptive mood)
 Subjunctive negation - nā ना نا (used with verbs in subjunctive and contrafactual mood)

Often to soften down the tone of the imperatives, the subjunctive and indicative negation are used to form negative imperatives. Imperatives can also be formed using subjunctives to give indirect commands to the third person and to formal second person. A peculiar feature of Hindi-Urdu is that it has imperatives in two tenses; present and the future tense. The present tense imperative gives command in the present and future imperative gives command for the future. Hindi-Urdu explicitly marks grammatical aspects and any verb can be put into the simple, habitual, perfective, and progressive aspects. Each aspect in turn can be conjugated into five different grammatical moods, imperative mood being one of them. In the table below, the verb करना karnā کرنا (to do) is conjugated into the imperative mood for all the four aspectual forms.

Sanskrit
In Sanskrit, लोट् लकार (lōṭ lakāra) is used with the verb to form the imperative mood. To form the negative, न (na) or मा (mā) (when the verb is in passive or active voice respectively) is placed before the verb in the imperative mood.

Bengali
Standard modern Bengali uses the negative postposition /nā/ after a future imperative formed using the -iyo fusional suffix (in addition, umlaut vowel changes in the verb root might take place).

Other Indo-European languages

Greek
Ancient Greek has imperative forms for present, aorist, and perfect tenses for the active, middle, and passive voices.  Within these tenses, forms exist for second and third persons, for singular, dual, and plural subjects.  Subjunctive forms with μή are used for negative imperatives in the aorist.

Present Active Imperative: 2nd sg. λεῖπε, 3rd sg. λειπέτω, 2nd pl. λείπετε, 3rd pl. λειπόντων.

In ancient Greek, the general order (with the idea of duration or repetition) is expressed using the present imperative and the punctual order (without the idea of duration or repetition) using the aorist imperative.

Russian
The commanding form in Russian language is formed from the base of the present tense. The most common form of the second person singular or plural. The form of the second person singular in the imperative mood is formed as follows:
 A verb with a present stem ending in – j – the form of the second person singular of the imperative mood is equal to the base: читаj-у — читай, убираj-у — убирай, открываj-у — открывай, поj-у — пой.

Irish
Irish has imperative forms in all three persons and both numbers, although the first person singular is most commonly found in the negative (e.g. ná cloisim sin arís "let me not hear that again").

Non-Indo-European languages

Finnish
In Finnish, there are two ways of forming a first-person plural imperative. A standard version exists, but it is typically replaced colloquially by the impersonal tense. For example, from mennä (to go), the imperative "let's go" can be expressed by menkäämme (standard form) or mennään (colloquial).

Forms also exist for second (sing. mene, plur. menkää) and third (sing. menköön, plur. menkööt) person. Only first person singular does not have an imperative.

Hebrew
In classical Hebrew, there is a form for positive imperative. It exists for singular and plural, masculine and feminine second-person. The imperative conjugations look like shortages of the future ones. However, in modern Hebrew, the future tense is often used in its place in colloquial speech, and the proper imperative form is considered formal or of higher register.

The negative imperative in those languages is more complicated. In modern Hebrew, for instance, it contains a synonym of the word "no", that is used only in negative imperative (אַל), and is followed by the future tense.

Japanese 
Japanese uses separate verb forms as shown below. For the verb kaku (write):

Korean 
Korean has six levels of honorific, all of which have their own imperative endings. Auxiliary verbs 않다 anta and 말다 malda are used for negative indicative and prohibitive, respectively. For the verb gada (go'):

Mandarin 
Standard Chinese uses different words of negation for the indicative and the prohibitive moods. For the verb  zuò (do):

Turkish 
For the imperative form, the second-person singular, Turkish uses the bare verb stem without the infinitive ending -mek/-mak. Other imperative forms use various suffixes. The second-person plural, which can also be used to express formality (See T–V distinction), uses the suffixes -in/-ın/-ün/-un. The second person double-plural, reserved for super formal contexts (usually public notifications), uses the suffixes -iniz/-ınız/-ünüz/-unuz. Third-person singular uses -sin/-sın/-sün/-sun. Third-person plural uses -sinler/-sınlar/-sünler/-sunlar (There is no third person double-plural in Turkish). First-person pronouns do not have imperative forms. All Turkish imperative suffixes change depending on the verb stem according to the rules of vowel harmony. For the verb içmek (to drink, also to smoke a cigarette or similar):

Turkish also has a separate optative mood. Conjugations of the optative mood for the first-person pronouns (singular içeyim, (double-)plural içelim) are sometimes incorrectly said to be first-person imperatives. Conjugations of the optative mood for second and third-person pronouns exist (second-person singular içesin, second-person (double-)plural içesiniz, third-person singular içe, third-person plural içeler), but are rarely used in practice.

Negative imperative forms are made in the same way, but using a negated verb as the base. For example, the second person singular imperative of içmemek (not to drink) is içme (don't drink). Other Turkic languages construct imperative forms similarly to Turkish.

See also
 Imperative logic
 Modality (natural language)
 Free choice inference
 Speech act
 Pragmatics

Footnotes

References 
 Austin, J. L. How to do things with words, Oxford, Clarendon Press 1962.
 Schmecken, H. Orbis Romanus, Paderborn, Schöningh 1975, .

Grammatical moods
Linguistic modality
Verb types